Mixed Company is a 1974 American comedy-drama film directed by Melville Shavelson and written by Shavelson and Mort Lachman.  It stars Barbara Harris, Joseph Bologna, Tom Bosley, Lisa Gerritsen, Dorothy Shay, Ruth McDevitt and Haywood Nelson.

Plot summary
Kathy Morrison (Harris), mother of three, who helps run a "color-blind" adoption program, wants to have another biological child.  Her husband, Pete (Bologna), the head coach of the Phoenix Suns, finds out he can't produce another child.  Kathy thinks about adopting a boy, Frederic "Freddie" Wilcox, and Pete does not want to adopt a boy who happens to be black.  When he relents, Freddie's arrival causes an upheaval in the Morrison's neighborhood, their school, and family.  Kathy's answer is to adopt another child, in this case two, a war-traumatized half-Vietnamese girl, Quan Tran, and a Hopi boy, Joe Rogers.  The new extended family must now learn to live together.

Cast
Barbara Harris as Kathy Morrison
Joseph Bologna as Pete Morrison
Tom Bosley as Al
Lisa Gerritsen as Liz Morrison
Dorothy Shay as Marge Reese
Ruth McDevitt as Miss Bergquist
Arianne Heller as Mary Morrison
Stephen Honanie as Joe Rogers
Haywood Nelson as Freddie Wilcox
Eric Olson as Rob Morrison
Jina Tan as Quan Tran
Bob G. Anthony as Krause
Roger Price as The Doctor
Keith Hamilton as Milton
Jason Clark as Police Sergeant
Charles J. Samsill as Police Officer
Jophery Clifford Brown as Basketball Player
Rodney Hundley as Announcer
Darell T. Garretson as Referee
Calvin Brown as Santa Claus
Al McCoy as Voice of the Phoenix Suns
Ron McIlwan as Walt Johnson

See also
 List of American films of 1974

External links

1974 films
1974 comedy-drama films
American comedy-drama films
American independent films
American basketball films
Films about adoption
Films directed by Melville Shavelson
Films scored by Fred Karlin
United Artists films
1970s English-language films
1970s American films